Big Snow Mountain is a  mountain summit located in British Columbia, Canada.

Description

Big Snow Mountain is a glaciated peak situated in the Coast Mountains, in a remote wilderness area that few visit. Precipitation runoff and glacier meltwater from Big Snow drains to Thorsen Creek → Bella Coola River → North Bentinck Arm, and to South Bentinck Arm via Brynildsen Creek → Smitley River → Noeick River. Topographic relief is significant as the summit rises 1,550 meters (5,085 feet) above Brynildsen Creek in 2.5 kilometers (1.55 mile). The mountain was named by a 1951 climbing party, and the landform's toponym was officially adopted April 15, 1984, by the Geographical Names Board of Canada.

Climate

Based on the Köppen climate classification, Big Snow Mountain is located in the marine west coast climate zone of western North America. Most weather fronts originate in the Pacific Ocean, and travel east toward the Coast Mountains where they are forced upward by the range (Orographic lift), causing them to drop their moisture in the form of rain or snowfall. As a result, the Coast Mountains experience high precipitation, especially during the winter months in the form of snowfall. Temperatures can drop below −20 °C with wind chill factors below −30 °C. This climate supports glaciers on the north, east and west slopes of Big Snow.

See also
 
 Geography of British Columbia

Gallery

References

External links
 Weather forecast: Big Snow Mountain

Pacific Ranges
Two-thousanders of British Columbia
Range 3 Coast Land District
Coast Mountains